Digital Security Agency is a Bangladesh government security and intelligence agency responsible for monitoring online communication and countering cyber crimes.  Md. Khairul Amin the former Director General of the agency.

History
Digital Security Agency was established under Information and Communication Technology Division  Ministry of Posts, Telecommunications and Information Technology. Md. Rezaul Karim ndc is the former Director General of the agency, he was the Second Director General of this agency.

References

2019 establishments in Bangladesh
Organisations based in Dhaka
Government agencies of Bangladesh
Bangladeshi intelligence agencies
Government agencies established in 2019
Law enforcement in Bangladesh